HMS Hampshire was a  destroyer of the Royal Navy. The description of guided missile destroyer seemed more likely to win approval from the Treasury and Government for an adequate number of warships the size of small cruisers, which could play many traditional cruiser flagship and command functions, but had no armour around its gun and missile magazine.

Construction and design
Hampshire was one of two County-class destroyers ordered under the British Admiralty's 1955–56 shipbuilding programme. She was laid down at John Brown & Company's Clydebank shipyard on 26 March 1959 and launched by Princess Margaret on 16 March 1961. The ship was completed on 15 March 1963.

The ship was propelled by a combination of steam turbines and gas turbines in a Combined steam and gas (COSAG) arrangement, driving two propeller shafts.

A twin launcher for the Seaslug anti-aircraft missile was fitted aft. Up to 39 Seaslugs could be carried horizontally in a magazine that ran much of the length of the ship. Close-in anti-aircraft protection was provided by a pair of Seacat (missile) launchers, while two twin QF 4.5 inch Mark V gun mounts were fitted forward. A helicopter deck and hangar allowed a single Westland Wessex helicopter to be operated.

A Type 965 long-range air-search radar and a Type 278 height-finding radar was fitted on the ship's mainmast, with a Type 992Q navigation radar and an array of ESM aerials were mounted on the ship's foremast. Type 901 fire control radar for the Seaslug missile was mounted aft. Type 184 sonar was fitted.

Operational service
From her third Commission in 1967 Hampshire flew the flag of the Flag Officer, Western Fleet (United Kingdom). In July 1969 she was present at Torbay for the Royal Review and presentation of a new colour to the Western Fleet (United Kingdom).

Decommissioning and disposal
In the late 1960s there were plans to upgrade Hampshire and sister destroyers armed with Seaslug Mk 1, with Seaslug Mk 2 and a digital combat system being fitted, but the upgrade of Hampshire and Devonshire was cancelled on 31 March 1967 because of the amount of the time the ships would be out of the operational fleet, with the remaining two upgrades cancelled in 1968.

In 1976 she was the first of the County-class destroyers to be decommissioned. This was at a time the Labour Government was making severe defence cuts under pressure from the International Monetary Fund (IMF).  She was cannibalised for spares to service her sister ships and subsequently sold for scrap in 1979, being broken up at Briton Ferry by Thos. W. Ward.

Commanding officers

Notable commanding officers include R A Trowbridge from 1967-1969 and R P Clayton between 1969 and 1970.

In media
The Hampshire appears in the UFO episode  "Destruction", as it is used to secretly place sealed tanks filled with lethal gas from an unnamed war under water.

References

Publications
 
 
 
 
 
 
 

 

County-class destroyers of the Royal Navy
Ships built on the River Clyde
1961 ships
Cold War destroyers of the United Kingdom